The 1999 Boston College Eagles football team represented Boston College during the 1999 NCAA Division I-A football season. Boston College was a member of the Big East Conference. The Eagles played their home games in 1999 at Alumni Stadium in Chestnut Hill, Massachusetts, which has been their home stadium since 1957.

Schedule

Roster

1999 team players in the NFL
The following players were claimed in the 2000 NFL Draft.

References

Boston College
Boston College Eagles football seasons
Boston College Eagles football
Boston College Eagles football